Î, î (i-circumflex) is a letter in the Friulian, Kurdish, Tupi alphabet, Persian Rumi script, Romanian alphabets and Phonetic Filipino. This letter also appears in French, Turkish, Italian, Welsh and Walloon languages as a variant of letter “i”.

Afrikaans

French

Î is a letter which appears in several French words, like  (to be born),  (abyss),  (master),  (fresh), and more. Unlike Â, Ê, and Ô, the circumflex does not alter the pronunciation of î or û.

The circumflex usually denotes the exclusion of a letter (usually an s) that was in a prior version of the word:
  became .
  became  and then .
  became  and then .

Friulian

Î is used to get a longer value of I, becoming . It can be found for example in all verbs of the fourth conjugation:  , (to revel). Another use of Î (and also the other long vowels), is due to Latin derivation. Instead of preserving the last vowel, in Friulian it was used to give a longer value to the penultimate vowel, ending the word with a consonant: gliru(m) < , (dormouse), where the ending u disappeared.

Italian
In Italian the circumflex accent is an optional accent. In this situation it can be replaced with a double "i" (E.g. "principii" ), with an i followed by a j (E.g. "principij"), with a single j (E.g. "principj") or, more simply, with a single "i" (E.g. "principi"). In contemporary usage, the single "i" is mostly used and the other variants are seen as archaic and overly formal.

Kurdish
Î is the 12th letter of the Kurdish alphabet and represents :  ('Kurdish language').

Persian
Î is used in the Persian Latin (Rumi) alphabet, equivalent to ي.

Romanian
Î is the 12th letter of the Romanian alphabet and denotes . This sound is also represented in Romanian as letter â. A compound word starting with the letter î retains it, even if it is in the middle of the word:  (misunderstanding). However, if a suffix is added, the î changes into â, as in the example:  (to hate),  (hated).

Turkish
In Turkish, î can indicate the  sound in Arabic loanwords where it is used as an adjectival suffix that makes an adjective from a noun: askerî (military), millî (national), dâhilî (internal) etc.

Welsh
In Welsh, î is used to represent long stressed i  when, without the circumflex, the vowel would be pronounced as short  (the mutated form of "team"), as opposed to   "no, nought, nothing".

Filipino 
In Tagalog and other Philippine languages, the circumflex, also called as 'Pakupyâ', is used to indicate a (stressed) Glottal stop 'ʔ'. It is however not used in casual text, but used in formal writing and to differentiate between Homographs.

e.g.:   'Pinunò' means 'leader'.

'Pinunô' means 'filled'.

Other usage

In mathematics
 The letter  is sometimes used to denote a unit vector in physics

Character mappings

See also
Circumflex
^I

References

I-circumflex
Romanian language
Friulian language